Västra Innerstaden was a city district in the west-central of Malmö Municipality, Sweden. On 1 July 2013, it was merged with Södra Innerstaden, forming Innerstaden. In 2012, Västra Innerstaden had a population of 33,191 of the municipality's 307,758. The area was 465 hectares.

Neighbourhoods
The neighbourhoods of Västra Innerstaden were:

Demographics
Västra Innerstaden is one of the more homogenous parts of Malmö with the lowest number of people born abroad: 12%, compared to Malmö's average of 29%:

The ten largest groups of foreign-born persons in 2009 were:
  Denmark (524)
  Poland (418)
  Germany (234)
  Former Yugoslavia (212)
  Finland (210)
  Iran (142)
  United States (130)
  United Kingdom (123)
  Hungary (106)
  Norway (101)

References

Former city districts of Malmö